Chris Lee Chun Kit (born 15 July 1982) is a Malaysian politician who has served as Member of the Penang State Legislative Assembly (MLA) for Pulau Tikus since May 2018. He also served as Member of the Penang Island City Council from 2013 to April 2018. He is a member of the Democratic Action Party (DAP), a component party of the state ruling but federal opposition Pakatan Harapan (PH) coalition.

Personal life 
Lee was born in George Town, Penang on 15 July 1982, the first born son of George and Betty Lee (née Chan). He has a younger sister, Lee Yen Ling, who was diagnosed with autism at an early age.

Early education 
Lee attended St. Andrew's Kindergarten and went on to finish his primary education at St. Xavier's Branch School. It was at the primary school that he met future DAP leader and former MP for Bukit Bendera, Zairil Khir Johari. He then proceeded to St. Xavier's Institution for his secondary education. He graduated secondary school in 1999. He then obtained an advanced diploma in mass communications at MDIS, Singapore before obtaining his bachelor's degree in business administration from the Nottingham-Trent University in a local undergraduate program at Olympia College.

Political career 
Lee politically active in 2007 and went on to join the Democratic Action Party (DAP). He initially joined the party as a volunteer but got more involved as time went on. In 2012, he became the Youth Chief for the party's Youth Wing division of Bukit Bendera as well as the party's Deputy Youth Chief in Penang.

Following the 2013 Penang state election, Chris Lee was appointed as one of the 24 councillors of the then Penang Island Municipal Council, taking office on 8 July. In 2015, the city status of George Town, Penang's capital city, was expanded to encompass the entirety of Penang Island, thus upgrading the local government into the present-day Penang Island City Council.

On 26 April 2018, prior to the state election that year, Chris Lee stepped down as a Councillor of the Penang Island City Council and was selected to contest the state constituency of Pulau Tikus, where he had spent his childhood years. Despite the three cornered tussle at the constituency, he prevailed in the election, winning by a margin of 9,245 votes.

Election results

See also 

Pulau Tikus (state constituency)

References

1982 births
Living people
People from Penang
Malaysian people of Chinese descent
Democratic Action Party (Malaysia) politicians
Members of the Penang State Legislative Assembly
21st-century Malaysian politicians